Niphargus sphagnicolus is a species of crustacean in family Niphargidae. It is endemic to Slovenia.

References

External links
 Niphargus Website - University of Ljubljana

Niphargidae
Crustaceans described in 1956
Endemic fauna of Slovenia
Taxonomy articles created by Polbot